Calhoun is a village in Richland County, Illinois, United States. The population was 222 at the 2000 census.

History
The community of Fairview, now Calhoun, is one of the oldest communities in Richland County.  While it was not officially organized under village government, the community of that name was known in the early 1830s.  It was originally platted into lots by Shadrach Ruark.  Reverend Ruark was an early Methodist who performed the first wedding in Richland County on October 20, 1841, when Ebeneezer Waker and Abigail Reed were united.  The original plat was lost and it was replatted in 1848.  When the post office was established, it took the name Calhoun, after Hugh Calhoun, the original settler
of what was known as Calhoun Prairie.

Calhoun School was built in 1912 and was only one story. The upper floor was added in 1920 when a two-year high school was added.  In 1922, it became a three-year high school. The high school used two classrooms in the basement in addition to the upper floor. Grades 1 through 8 were taught on the first floor.  Calhoun had one of the first three-year high schools in Richland County.

Geography
Calhoun lies just east of Illinois State Route 130, southeast of Olney.

Demographics

As of the census of 2000, there were 222 people, 86 households, and 65 families residing in the village. The racial makeup of the village was 94.14% White, 1.35% Native American, 3.60% Asian, and 0.90% from two or more races.

There were 86 households, out of which 39.5% had children under the age of 18 living with them, 53.5% were married couples living together, 15.1% had a female householder with no husband present, and 24.4% were non-families. 18.6% of all households were made up of individuals, and 11.6% had someone living alone who was 65 years of age or older. The average household size was 2.58 and the average family size was 2.94.

In the village, the population was spread out, with 31.1% under the age of 18, 8.6% from 18 to 24, 27.5% from 25 to 44, 19.4% from 45 to 64, and 13.5% who were 65 years of age or older. The median age was 34 years. For every 100 females, there were 89.7 males. For every 100 females age 18 and over, there were 86.6 males.

The median income for a household in the village was $25,809, and the median income for a family was $27,500. Males had a median income of $25,000 versus $19,375 for females. The per capita income for the village was $14,679. About 20.0% of families and 27.2% of the population were below the poverty line, including 41.9% of those under the age of eighteen and 6.7% of those 65 or over.

References

Villages in Richland County, Illinois
Villages in Illinois
Populated places established in 1848
1848 establishments in Illinois